Ganbare Goemon Pachisuro is a slot machine (known in Japan as "pachisuro") based on the Ganbare Goemon franchise. It was announced on February 4, 2009, with the opening of the official website. The site displayed highly detailed 3D rendered pictures of the characters, along with a CGI trailer that runs for one minute and thirty-three seconds. This is the third installment for arcades by Konami based on their Ganbare Goemon series since Mr. Goemon back in 1986 and Medal Game in 1997.

The game features three playable modes, each symbolized by a specific character. There is a Goemon-based mode, Ebisumaru-based mode and Princess Yuki-based mode. It has been assumed that each mode has a unique song sung by that character. On February 17, 2009, a second trailer was released. This seven-minute video went into the game in more detail, explaining various aspects and showing more clips. The game was released in Japan on May 25, 2009, and is unlikely to leave into overseas territories. This pachisuro also features many remixes of previous Goemon music (mostly from Goemon's Great Adventure).

A sequel, Ganbare Goemon Pachisuro 2, was released in September 2011. It is based on Ganbare Goemon 2: Kiteretsu Shōgun Magginesu for the Super Famicom.

References

External links
Official website for the sequel via Internet Archive

2009 video games
2011 video games
Ganbare Goemon games
Japan-exclusive video games
Pachislot video games
Video games developed in Japan